69 Squadron may refer to:
No. 3 Squadron RAAF, an Australian unit which was designated No. 69 Squadron of the Royal Flying Corps during a part of World War I
No. 69 (Reserve) Squadron RAAF, a reserve Australian unit formed as part of No. 4 Service Flying Training School RAAF during World War II
 69 Squadron (Israel)
 No. 69 Squadron RAF, United Kingdom
 69th Aero Squadron, Air Service, United States Army
 69th Bomb Squadron, United States Air Force
 69th Fighter Squadron, United States Air Force
 69th Troop Carrier Squadron, United States Air Force
 VP-69, United States Navy